was a town located in Toyota District, Hiroshima Prefecture, Japan.

As of 2003, the town had an estimated population of 2,706 and a density of 192.19 persons per km2. The total area was 14.08 km2.

On March 20, 2005, Kure, along with the towns of Ondo, Kurahashi and Kamagari (all from Aki District), and the towns of Yasuura and Toyohama (all from Toyota District), was merged into the expanded city of Kure and no longer exists as an independent municipality.

External links
 Official website of Kure  (some English content)

Dissolved municipalities of Hiroshima Prefecture